Nicholas M. Nighswander (born November 3, 1952) is a former professional American football player who played Center in 1974 for the Buffalo Bills.

External links
Pro-Football-Reference

1952 births
Living people
American football centers
Buffalo Bills players
Morehead State Eagles football players